Pinus dabeshanensis, Dabieshan white pine, is a species of pine found only in China. Some sources consider it as a synonym of Chinese white pine (Pinus armandii), which it closely resembles.

The natural range of Pinus dabeshanensis  is very restricted although it has been used locally in planting programs; the species occurs in the Dabie Mountains in Anhui and Hubei provinces at elevations between 900 and 1400 m.

References

Further reading 
 Peng, Z. H., and Z. H. Jiang. "Pinus dabeshanensis and its origin." Pei-ching: China Forestry Publishing House 86p.-illus., col. illus..  En, Ch Icones, Chromosome numbers, Anatomy and morphology. Geog 2 (1999).
 WANG, Ai-hua, et al. "Wood Structure and Variation of Pinus dabeshanensis Cheng et Law [J]." Journal of Anhui Agricultural University 2 (2004): 013.

dabeshanensis
Endemic flora of China
Trees of China
Flora of Anhui
Flora of Hubei
Vulnerable flora of Asia
Taxonomy articles created by Polbot
Taxobox binomials not recognized by IUCN